Lilies of the Field is a 1924 American silent drama film directed by John Francis Dillon, produced by and starring actress Corinne Griffith, and distributed by Associated First National Pictures. It is based on a 1921 play, Lilies of the Field, by William J. Hurlbut. The film was remade by Griffith again as an early sound film in 1930.

Plot
As described in a film magazine review, neglected by her pleasure-loving husband, Mildred Harker attends a ball and becomes compromised by an admirer. Walter Harker divorces her and obtains custody of their baby. Mildred, employed as a model, refuses the offer of Louis Willing to occupy an apartment at his expense and to become his mistress. Willing, who really is in love with her, becomes convinced of Mildred's worthiness. They marry and she regains custody of her child.

Cast

Preservation
With no copies of Lilies of the Field located in any film archives, it is a lost film. A trailer to this film exists at the Library of Congress.

References

External links

Stills at silenthollywood.com
lobby card

1924 films
American silent feature films
Lost American films
American films based on plays
Films directed by John Francis Dillon
1924 drama films
Silent American drama films
First National Pictures films
American black-and-white films
1924 lost films
Lost drama films
1920s American films